Mia Su-Ling Gregerson-Dahle (born December 19, 1972) is an American politician serving as a member of the Washington House of Representatives from the 33rd Legislative District.

Career
In 2007 Gregerson was elected to the SeaTac City Council. In 2011, Gregerson held onto her seat on the council by a 31 vote margin against Republican Erin Sitterley.

Gregerson was appointed to the state legislature on December 16, 2013 as the preferred candidate of the King County Council, despite being the second choice of the 33rd Legislative District Democratic Precinct Committee Officers. Gregerson filled the vacancy left after Dave Upthegrove resigned from his seat in the legislature on December 16, 2013, following his election to the King County Council.

In a 2015 re-match, Gregerson lost her re-election campaign for SeaTac City Council Position 7 with 40.90% of the votes (1512 votes). Her opponent Erin Sitterley won with 58.70% (2170 votes).

References

External links 
 Mia Gregerson at ballotpedia.org

Democratic Party members of the Washington House of Representatives
1972 births
Living people
American politicians of Taiwanese descent
American women of Taiwanese descent in politics
University of Washington alumni
Women state legislators in Washington (state)
21st-century American women politicians
21st-century American politicians
People from SeaTac, Washington
Asian-American people in Washington (state) politics